Ahmed Belal (born March 12, 1968) is an Egyptian handball player. He competed for Egypt's national team at the 1992, 1996 and 2000 Summer Olympics.

References 

1968 births
Living people
Egyptian male handball players
Olympic handball players of Egypt
Handball players at the 1992 Summer Olympics
Handball players at the 1996 Summer Olympics
Handball players at the 2000 Summer Olympics